This is a list of topics that are included in high school physics curricula or textbooks.

Mathematical Background 
SI Units
Scalar (physics)
Euclidean vector
Motion graphs and derivatives
Pythagorean theorem
Trigonometry

Motion and forces
Motion
Force

Linear motion
Linear motion
Displacement
Speed
Velocity
Acceleration
Center of mass
Mass
Momentum
Newton's laws of motion
Work (physics)
Free body diagram

Rotational motion

Angular momentum (Introduction)
Angular velocity
Centrifugal force
Centripetal force
Circular motion
Tangential velocity
Torque

Conservation of energy and momentum
Energy
Conservation of energy
Elastic collision
Inelastic collision
Inertia
Moment of inertia
Momentum
Kinetic energy
Potential energy
Rotational energy

Electricity and magnetism
Ampère's circuital law
Capacitor
Coulomb's law
Diode
Direct current
Electric charge
Electric current
Alternating current
Electric field
Electric potential energy
Electron
Faraday's law of induction
Ion
Inductor
Joule heating
Lenz's law
Magnetic field
Ohm's law
Resistor
Transistor
Transformer
Voltage

Heat
Entropy
First law of thermodynamics
Heat
Heat transfer
Second law of thermodynamics
Temperature
Thermal energy
Thermodynamic cycle
Volume (thermodynamics)
Work (thermodynamics)

Waves
Wave
Longitudinal wave
Transverse waves
Transverse wave
Standing Waves
Wavelength
Frequency
Light
Light ray
Speed of light
Sound
Speed of sound
Radio waves
Harmonic oscillator
Hooke's law
Reflection
Refraction
Snell's law
Refractive index
Total internal reflection
Diffraction
Interference (wave propagation)
Polarization (waves)
Vibrating string
Doppler effect

Gravity
Gravitational potential
Newton's law of universal gravitation
Universal Gravitational Constant

See also
Outline of physics
Physics education

References

Further reading

 

 

Physics education
Pre-college
Primary education
Secondary education-related lists
Education-related lists